Euchloe guaymasensis, the Sonoran marble or Sonoran white, is a species of butterfly in the family Pieridae. It is native to Sonora in Mexico and has been seen once in Arizona in the United States.

The upperside is pale yellow. The forewing has a black tip and a black bar toward the front edge. The underside is marbled with green.

This species occurs in rocky desert habitat. Its host plant is western tansymustard (Descurainia pinnata). Adults fly in February and March.

References

External links
Images: Euchloe guyamasensis - Butterflies of America

guaymasensis
Butterflies of North America
Butterflies described in 1986